The 1856 United States presidential election in Georgia took place on November 4, 1856, as part of the 1856 United States presidential election. Voters chose 10 representatives, or electors to the Electoral College, who voted for president and vice president.

Georgia voted for the Democratic candidate, James Buchanan, over American Party candidate Millard Fillmore. Buchanan won Georgia by a margin of 14.28%.

Republican Party candidate John C. Frémont was not on the ballot in the state.

Results

References

Georgia
1856
1852 Georgia (U.S. state) elections